Yale Summers (July 26, 1933 – May 6, 2012) was an American actor and producer, whose credits included the 1960s CBS television series, Daktari, with Marshall Thompson.

Summers was heavily involved with the Screen Actors Guild. He was a member of the SAG national board of directors for twenty-seven years and the national executive committee for eighteen years.

Acting career
Born in Manhattan, Summers made his acting debut in the 1961 film, Mad Dog Coll, playing a small unbilled role. The remainder of his career was almost entirely occupied with television. He appeared in a recurring role on the ABC soap opera, General Hospital, as Dr. Bob Ayres during the 1964-1965 television season. His best known role was as Jack Dane on Daktari, which aired from 1966 to 1968. From 1972 to 1974, Summers replaced Lawrence Casey in the NBC daytime series, Return to Peyton Place, as the character Rodney Harrington.

His additional television roles included guest spots on Land of the Giants, My Favorite Martian, My Three Sons, The Outer Limits, Quincy, M.E., Fantasy Island, and The Donna Reed Show.

SAG and AFTRA involvement
Summers was a founding member of the SAG Awards Committee and for a time the chairman of that committee. Summers was a co-founder and producer of the Screen Actors Guild Awards from 1995 until 2009.

Summers also served as the former national treasurer and the recording secretary for SAG. Summers was a trustee of the SAG Pension and Health Funds and a member of the board for the SAG Foundation. In 2008, SAG awarded Summers the Ralph Morgan Award for his service and involvement with the union.

Summers was active with another actors' union, the American Federation of Television and Radio Artists. He served a combined twenty-four years on the national AFTRA board and the union's local Los Angeles chapter.

SAG and AFTRA merged in March 2012, shortly before Summers' death.

Personal life
The only child of Joseph and Edlie Neuvohner, Summers received a Bachelor of Business Administration degree from Cornell University in 1955 and served in the United States Army, having attained the rank of lieutenant.

He married actress Suzanne Ried in 1967. They had 2 children, one of whom is Jolie Elean Summers. He also had 2 grandchildren at the time of his death.

Filmography

Death
Summers died in Beverly Hills, California at the age of 78 from complications of chronic obstructive pulmonary disease.

Actor and former SAG President Ed Asner said, "Yale was a good man and a good friend who was totally dedicated to his belief in the union. He was completely unbiased and never took sides. He had a purist vision of how the guild should be run and wasn't swayed by the influence of special interest groups. He put the best interest of the guild and union first. I'm deeply sorry for his passing."

References

External links

1933 births
2012 deaths
American male television actors
American male film actors
Screen Actors Guild
Male actors from New York City
People from Manhattan
United States Army officers
Respiratory disease deaths in California
Deaths from chronic obstructive pulmonary disease
Cornell University alumni